Phylloporus is a genus of fungi in the family Boletaceae (suborder Boletineae). The genus has a cosmopolitan distribution, and contains about 50 species, mostly in tropical areas.

Species

References

External links

 
Boletales genera
Taxa described in 1888
Taxa named by Lucien Quélet